Hercegovina Osiguranje (Croatian for Herzegovina Insurance) is an insurance company based in Mostar, Bosnia and Herzegovina which mainly serves the country's Croat community. It was formed in 1998.

The firm is active in all municipalities in the country with a Croatian majority, as well as a few where a large Croatian minority is present. It is one of the few insurance firms in the nation which is ISO 9000 certified .

External links 
Hercegovina Osiguranje (Croatian)

Companies based in Mostar
Companies of Bosnia and Herzegovina
Financial services companies established in 1998